Yang Jianhou (1839–1917), or Yang Chien-hou, was the younger son of the founder of Yang-style t'ai chi ch'uan, Yang Luchan, and a well known teacher of the soft style martial art of t'ai chi ch'uan (taijiquan). Yang's older brother, Yang Pan-hou, was the senior of Jianhou's generation, and also an important instructor of t'ai chi ch'uan. Yang Jianhou's sons Yang Chengfu and Yang Shao-hou were also famous teachers of t'ai chi ch'uan.

T'ai chi ch'uan lineage tree with Yang-style focus

References
 

1839 births
1917 deaths
Chinese tai chi practitioners